Lansweeper is an IT asset management solution that gathers hardware and software information of computers and other devices on a computer network for management, compliance and audit purposes.

History 
Lansweeper was founded in Belgium in 2004.

In October 2020, Lansweeper announced the acquisition of Fing.

In June 2021, Lansweeper received a €130 million investment from Insight Partners to accelerate further growth.

Description 
The main purpose of Lansweeper derives from a discovery phase of sweeping round a local area network (LAN) and maintaining an inventory of the hardware assets and software deployed on those assets.  Reports from the inventory enable complete hardware and software reports on the devices and can be used to identify problems.  Lansweeper can collect information on all Windows, Linux and Mac devices and can also IP-addressable network appliances.

The software incorporates an integrated ticket-based Help Desk module that can be used to assist issues to be captured and tracked through to completion.  There is also a software module that allows Lansweeper to orchestrate software updates on Windows computers.

The Lansweeper central inventory database must be located on either an SQL Compact or SQL Server database on a Microsoft Windows machine. In 2019 Lansweeper was discovered to be vulnerable to an SQL injection vulnerability. Lansweeper claims while a minimum default configuration can be supported by placing all its components on a single server the application has the capability to scale up to hundreds of thousands of devices.  While Lansweeper can be set up agentless it may be recommended to use agents for more complex configurations.

Lansweeper has a freeware version of the product but it is limited in the number of devices available and functionality provided unless appropriate licenses are purchased.

Criticisms 

A PC World review in 2010 claimed the interface rendered less rapidly than Spiceworks.

Lansweeper itself does not directly provide a network intrusion system; however, Lansweeper claims it is able to partner with an addition tool to address that area.

Notes

References

External links 
 

Network management
Utility software
IT infrastructure